Who Knows? is a Canadian television panel game quiz show which aired on CBC Television in 1959.

Premise
James Bannerman hosted this show in which a panel attempts to guess the identity of an artifact from a gallery or museum. Archaeologists Walter Kenyon and John Lunn of the Royal Ontario Museum were regular panelists who were joined by a third guest panelist. This concept was previously demonstrated during some episodes of Tabloid.

CBC broadcast a similar panel game quiz program, What on Earth, from 1971 to 1975.

Scheduling
This half-hour series was broadcast on Fridays at 9 p.m. from 3 July to 25 September 1959.

References

1959 Canadian television series debuts
1959 Canadian television series endings
1950s Canadian game shows
Black-and-white Canadian television shows
CBC Television original programming
Panel games